Mendicant Ridge is a massive  long high mountain located about  east-southeast of Crawford, Colorado in the Gunnison National Forest, Gunnison County, Colorado, United States. Trending roughly northeast, Mendicant Ridge has four distinct summits that are often confused in the reference literature.

References

External links
Topographical map
Mendicant Ridge Trail
USFS Paonia District Trails Map

See also

List of Colorado mountain ranges
List of Colorado mountain summits
List of Colorado county high points

West Elk Mountains
Mountains of Gunnison County, Colorado
Gunnison National Forest
Mountains of Colorado
Ridges of Colorado
North American 3000 m summits